The black-chinned hummingbird (Archilochus alexandri) is a small hummingbird occupying a broad range of habitats. It is migratory, spending winter as far south as Mexico.

Taxonomy
A hybrid between this species and Anna's hummingbird was called "Trochilus" violajugulum. The black-chinned hummingbird is also known to hybridize with Anna's, Lucifer, broad-tailed, and Costa's hummingbirds.

As of 2011, it has the smallest known genome of all living amniotes, only 0.91 pg (910 million base pairs).

Description
Adults are metallic green above and white below with green flanks. Their bill is long, straight and very slender. The adult male has a black face and chin, a glossy purple throat band and a dark forked tail. The female has a dark rounded tail with white tips and no throat patch; they are similar to female ruby-throated hummingbirds. Juvenile plumage is similar to that of adult females, but with buff margins on the dorsal feathers. Juvenile males may also possess purple feathers on their throats.

Young are born almost featherless, but obtain a complete set of feathers within three weeks of hatching. Juveniles can begin replacing their plumage in November, and acquire their first basic plumage between April and May. Molts will then occur annually, taking 7–8 months at the population level.

Similar species to the black-chinned hummingbird include broad-tailed hummingbird, rufous hummingbird, calliope hummingbird, Allen's hummingbird, lucifer hummingbird, Anna's hummingbird, and Costa's hummingbird.

Distribution and habitat
Black-chinned hummingbirds are found in most of the western United States, reaching north into Canada in Alberta and British Columbia, east to Oklahoma, and as far south as Mexico. They can be found in mountains, woodlands, orchards, meadows, and chaparral habitats. Their breeding habitat is open, semiarid areas, usually near water in the western United States, northern Mexico, and southern British Columbia.

Behaviour and ecology
These birds feed on nectar from flowers using a long extendable tongue or catch insects on the wing. While collecting nectar, they also assist in plant pollination.

The males and females of this species use different habitats from one another for breeding territories. Black-chinned hummingbirds can exhibit territorial behavior around feeders as well as at other small feeding sites, and become more defensive as the breeding season continues. However, if there are a large number of individuals in an area as well as multiple food sources, this species will exhibit very little territoriality. Unlike most passerines, the agonistic call of the black-chinned hummingbird is acoustically complex, with notes ordered in non-random patterns, and are even more complex than their songs. This species also uses diving displays ( dives) for territory defense as well as courtship, producing a variety of tones as air passes through their feathers during the plunge.

The female builds a well-camouflaged nest in a protected location in a shrub or tree using plant fibers, spider web silk, downy feathers and lichens. Research also suggests that they may purposefully nest near the active nests of much larger, predatory birds, as a means of reducing nest predation. The larger predators are too large and slow to be interested in the hummingbird, but their presence will deter other birds that might be interested in the black-chinned hummingbird's eggs or newly hatched chicks. This species lays 2 small ( in width) white eggs at a time, incubating them for a period of 12–16 days.

Because of their small size, they are vulnerable to insect-eating birds and animals.

Status
Because of its large range, considerable population size and growth (14.6% increase per decade), this species has been labeled as a least-concern species. Trend maps for black-chinned hummingbirds showed a relatively stable population between 2009-2019, albeit with some decline in late years of that decade.

References

External links

 Black-chinned hummingbird Species Account – Cornell Lab of Ornithology
 
 
 Video of a Female black-chinned hummingbird from Logan, Utah
 
 

black-chinned hummingbird
Native birds of Western Canada
Birds of the Great Basin
Birds of Mexico
Fauna of the Chihuahuan Desert
Fauna of the Sonoran Desert
Native birds of the Western United States
black-chinned hummingbird
black-chinned hummingbird